Mireille Gingras, Lady Gillings (born 1962) is a US-based Canadian neurobiologist and entrepreneur. She founded HUYA Bioscience International, a biotech consulting firm in 2004, and is the San Diego, California company's CEO and Executive Chair. The company has offices in Pudong, Shanghai, China.

In 2010, Gillings' interest in China as a source of "research-intensive, expensive-to-develop medicines that are the stuff of patents and high profit margins" attracted the interest of Fortune magazine.

Born in Montreal, Quebec, Gillings earned her PhD from Radboud University Nijmegen and has held postdoctoral fellowships at Bordeaux University in France and The Scripps Research Institute in La Jolla, California. She received her bachelor's degree from Montréal's Concordia University.

Also one of the founders of MIR3, she is a "serial entrepreneur" as she has described herself. Gillings is at least functional in several languages, including Mandarin, in addition to her native French.

Personal life
In 2012, she married Dennis Gillings in Hawaii.

References

1971 births
Living people
Canadian women chief executives
Concordia University alumni
Businesspeople from Montreal
Radboud University Nijmegen alumni
Scripps Research
University of Bordeaux alumni
Canadian women neuroscientists
Canadian expatriates in the United States
Canadian neuroscientists
Wives of knights
Scientists from Montreal
Date of birth missing (living people)